Norman Walker may refer to:

Norman Walker (bass) (1907–1963), English bass opera singer
Norman W. Walker (1886–1985), British-American raw food and alternative health advocate
Norman Walker (director) (1892–1963), British film director
Norman Walker (footballer) (1935–2009), Australian rules footballer
Norman R. Walker (1889–1949), Canadian-born American pharmacist and politician in Alaska
Norman Snowy Walker (born 1901), South African lawn bowler
Sir Norman Walker (dermatologist) (1862–1942), Scottish physician

See also
Norman Walker Porteous, theologian
Hugh Norman-Walker (1916–1985), officer in the British Colonial Office